Knema elmeri is a species of plant in the family Myristicaceae. It is a tree found in Borneo.

References

elmeri
Trees of Borneo
Least concern plants
Taxonomy articles created by Polbot
Taxa named by Elmer Drew Merrill